Asura likiangensis is a moth of the family Erebidae. It is found in China.

Subspecies
Asura likiangensis likiangensis
Asura likiangensis grisescens Daniel, 1952 (Yunnan)

References

likiangensis
Moths described in 1952
Moths of Asia